Enrique García (born 15 July 1943) is a Mexican gymnast. He competed in eight events at the 1968 Summer Olympics.

References

1943 births
Living people
Mexican male artistic gymnasts
Olympic gymnasts of Mexico
Gymnasts at the 1968 Summer Olympics
Sportspeople from Chihuahua (state)
Pan American Games medalists in gymnastics
Pan American Games bronze medalists for Mexico
Gymnasts at the 1967 Pan American Games
20th-century Mexican people